Rineloricaria pareiacantha is a species of catfish in the family Loricariidae. It is native to South America, where it occurs in the Santa Lucía River basin in Uruguay. The species reaches 10 cm (3.9 inches) in length and is believed to be a facultative air-breather.

References 

Loricariini
Fish described in 1943
Catfish of South America
Fish of Uruguay